The 2018–19 Vijay Hazare Trophy was the 17th season of the Vijay Hazare Trophy, a List A cricket tournament in India. It was contested by the 37 domestic cricket teams of India, with nine teams in Group B. The group stage started on 19 September 2018, with the top five teams across Group A and Group B progressing to the quarter-finals of the competition. Delhi, Andhra and Hyderabad all progressed from Group B to the knock-out phase of the tournament.

Points table

Fixtures

Round 1

Round 2

Round 3

Round 4

Round 5

Round 6

Round 7

Round 8

Round 9

Round 10

Round 11

Round 12

References

Vijay Hazare Trophy
Vijay Hazare Trophy
Vijay Hazare Trophy